Lluís Miquel Recoder i Miralles (Barcelona, Spain 29 September 1958) is a Spanish politician. He was mayor of Sant Cugat del Vallès in Barcelona Province, Catalonia, Spain from 1999 to 2010 and held the office of Minister of Planning and Sustainability of the Generalitat de Catalunya from 29 December 2010 to 27 December 2012.

Personal life
he holds a degree in law from the University of Barcelona, with a specialization in urban law and development.

Career

As of 2013 he was an Advisory Partner at KPMG Spain. He is a member of Convergència Democràtica de Catalunya (CDC). He was a founder of the Joventut Nacionalista de Catalunya, or Nationalist Youth of Catalonia, the youth sector of the CDC, of which he was secretary and president from 1986 to 1991. In the Catalan elections of 1999 and 2003 he was elected diputat of the Catalan Parliament, but left to dedicate himself to municipal politics in 2006.

Recoder has described himself as a Catalan nationalist.

In early 2010, he proposed that the three largest political parties in Catalonia, Convergence and Union, Republican Left of Catalonia, and Socialists' Party of Catalonia, form a tripartite coalition to combat a possible overturn of the Statute of Autonomy of Catalonia by the Constitutional Court of Spain, indicating that such a coalition could be a "solution in a difficult time for Catalonia." As of May 18, 2010, the three, along with the Initiative for Catalonia Greens, agreed to collaborate with an aim to reforming the Constitutional Court of Spain.

References

External links 

Avui (Catalan Daily Newspaper)
Avui – "Recoder Opens the Door to a Government of CIU, PSC, and ERC"

1958 births
Living people
Planning ministers of Catalonia